Muhammad Hamman Yaji (1863-1929) was Emir of Madagali, Nigeria, part of the Adamawa Emirate. Known for his personal diary recording his daily life and activities from 1912 to 1927, he was a Fulbe raider and slave trader near the border of present-day Adamawa State, Nigeria, and Mayo-Tsanaga, Far North Region, Cameroon. Originally written in Arabic, his diary provides a rare local perspective on early 20th century sub-Saharan daily life under colonial rule.

Further reading

References 

1863 births
1929 deaths
African slave traders

Nigerian traditional rulers
Emirs of Madagali